Unternberg is a municipality in the district of Tamsweg in the state of Salzburg in Austria.

See also
 Salzburgerland
 Salzburg

References

Cities and towns in Tamsweg District